The 2011 Phillips 66 Big 12 Men's Basketball Championship was the 2011 edition of the Big 12 Conference's championship tournament held at the Sprint Center in Kansas City, Missouri from March 9 until March 12, 2011. It was won by top-seeded Kansas.

Seeding
The Tournament consisted of a 12 team single-elimination tournament with the top 4 seeds receiving a bye.

Schedule

Tournament bracket

Asterisk denotes game ended in overtime.
Rankings reflect AP Poll for week of 3/7/2011.

All-Tournament Team
Most Outstanding Player – Marcus Morris, Kansas

See also
2011 Big 12 Conference women's basketball tournament
2011 NCAA Division I men's basketball tournament
2010–11 NCAA Division I men's basketball rankings

References

External links
Official 2011 Big 12 Men's Basketball Tournament Bracket

Tournament
Big 12 men's basketball tournament
Big 12 men's basketball tournament
Big 12 men's basketball tournament
College sports tournaments in Missouri